The Tropic of Capricorn (or the Southern Tropic) is the circle of latitude that contains the subsolar point at the December (or southern) solstice. It is thus the southernmost latitude where the Sun can be seen directly overhead. It also reaches 90 degrees below the horizon at solar midnight on the June Solstice. Its northern equivalent is the Tropic of Cancer.

The Tropic of Capricorn is one of the five major circles of latitude marked on maps of Earth.

Less than 3% of the world's population lives south of it; this is equivalent to about 30% of the population of the Southern Hemisphere.

Name 
When this line of latitude was named in the last centuries BC, the Sun was in the constellation Capricornus at the December solstice. This is the date each year when the Sun reaches zenith at this latitude, the southernmost declination it reaches for the year. (Due to the precession of the equinoxes the Sun currently appears in Sagittarius at this solstice.)

Geography and environment 
The Tropic of Capricorn is the dividing line between the Southern Temperate Zone to the south and the tropics to the north. The Northern Hemisphere equivalent of the Tropic of Capricorn is the Tropic of Cancer.

The Tropic of Capricorn's position is not fixed, but constantly changes because of a slight wobble in the Earth's longitudinal alignment relative to its orbit around the Sun. Earth's axial tilt varies over a 41,000 year period from 22.1 to 24.5 degrees and currently resides at about 23.4 degrees. This wobble means that the Tropic of Capricorn is currently drifting northward at a rate of almost half an arcsecond (0.468″) of latitude, or 15 metres, per year (it was at exactly 23° 27′S in 1917 and will be at 23° 26'S in 2045).  Therefore, distance between Arctic Circle and Tropic of Capricorn is essentially constant moving in tandem. See under circles of latitude for information.

There are approximately 10 hours, 41 minutes of daylight during the June solstice (Southern Hemisphere winter). During the December solstice (Southern Hemisphere summer), there are 13 hours, 35 minutes of daylight. The length of the Tropic of Capricorn at 23°26′11.7″S is 36,788 km (22,859 mi).

Africa 
In most of this belt of southern Africa, a minimum of seasonal rainfall is reliable and farming is possible, though yields struggle to compete with for example the Mississippi basin, even against like-to-like soil fertilisers.  Rivers have been successfully dammed particularly flowing from relief precipitation areas (high emininences) and those from the edge of the Great Rift Valley, such as the Zambezi, well within the Tropics.  This, with alluvial or enriched soil, enables substantial yield grain farming in areas with good soil.  Across this large region pasture farming is widespread, where intensive, brief and rotational it helps to fertilise and stabilise the soil, preventing run-off and desertification. This approach is traditional to many tribes and promoted by government advisors such as Allan Savory, a Zimbabwean-born biologist, farmer, game rancher, politician and international consultant and co-founder of the Savory Institute. According to the United Nations University Our World dissemination he is credited with developing "holistic management" in the 1960s and has led anti-desertification efforts in Africa for decades using a counterintuitive approach to most developed economies of increasing the number of livestock on grasslands rather than fencing them off for conservation.  Such practices in this area have seen success and won generous awards; he gave the keynote speech at UNCCD's Land Day in 2018, and later that year a TED (conference) address, widely re-broadcast.

Australia 
In Australia, areas around the Tropic have some of the world's most variable rainfall. In the east advanced plants such as flowering shrubs and eucalyptus and in most bioregions grasses have adapted to cope with means such as deep roots and little transpiration. Wetter areas, seasonally watered, are widely pasture farmed. As to animals, birds and marsupials are well-adapted.  Naturally difficult arable agriculture specialises in dry fruits, nuts and modest water consumption produce. Other types are possible given reliable irrigation sources and, ideally, water-retentive enriched or alluvial soils, especially wheat; shallow irrigation sources very widely dry up in and after drought years.  The multi-ridge Great Dividing Range brings relief precipitation enough to make hundreds of kilometres either side cultivable, and its rivers are widely dammed to store necessary water; this benefits the settled areas of New South Wales and Queensland.

Behind the end of the green hills, away from the Pacific, which is subject to warm, negative phases of the El Niño–Southern Oscillation (colloquially this is an "El Niño year/season") is a white, red and yellow landscape of 2,800 to 3,300 kilometres of rain shadow heading west in turn feature normally arid cattlelands of the Channel Country, the white Kati Thanda-Lake Eyre National Park, the mainly red Mamungari Conservation Park, then the Gibson Desert, after others the dry landscape settlement of Kalbarri on the west coast and its rest, northward.  The Channel Country features an arid landscape with a series of ancient flood plains from rivers which only flow intermittently. The principal rivers are Georgina River, Cooper Creek and the Diamantina River.  In most years, their waters are absorbed into the earth or evaporate, but when there is sufficient rainfall in their catchment area, these rivers flow into Lake Eyre, South Australia. One of the most significant rainfall events occurred in 2010 when a monsoonal low from ex-Cyclone Olga created a period of exceptional rainfall.

El Niño adverse phases cause a shift in atmospheric circulation; rainfall becomes reduced over Indonesia and Australia, rainfall and tropical cyclone formation increases over the tropical Pacific. The low-level surface trade winds, which normally blow from east to west along the equator, either weaken or start blowing from the other direction.

South America 
In South America, whilst in the continental cratons soils are almost as old as in Australia and Southern Africa, the presence of the geologically young and evolving Andes means that this region is on the western side of the subtropical anticyclones and thus receives warm and humid air from the Atlantic Ocean. As a result, areas in Brazil adjacent to the Tropic are impressively productive agricultural regions, producing large quantities of crops such as sugarcane, and the natural rainforest vegetation has been almost entirely cleared, except for a few remaining patches of Atlantic Forest. Further south in Argentina, the temperate grasslands of the Pampas region is equally influential in wheat, soybeans, maize, and beef, making the country one of the largest worldwide agricultural exporters, similar to the role played by the Prairies region in Canada.

West of the Andes, which creates a rain shadow, air is further cooled and dried by the cold Humboldt Current which makes it very arid, creating the Atacama Desert, one of the driest in the world, so that no glaciers exist between Volcán Sajama at 18˚30'S and Cerro Tres Cruces at 27˚S. Vegetation here is almost non-existent, though on the eastern slopes of the Andes rainfall is adequate for rainfed agriculture.

Around the world 
Starting at the Prime Meridian and heading eastwards, the Tropic of Capricorn passes through 10 countries:

{| class="wikitable plainrowheaders"
! scope="col" | Co-ordinates
! scope="col" | Country, territory or ocean
! scope="col" | Notes
|-
| style="background:#b0e0e6;" | 
! scope="row" style="background:#b0e0e6;" | Atlantic Ocean
| style="background:#b0e0e6;" |
|-
| 
! scope="row" | 
| Erongo, Khomas, Hardap, Khomas (again), and Omaheke regions
|-
| 
! scope="row" | 
| Kgalagadi, Kweneng and Central districts
|-
| 
! scope="row" | 
| Limpopo Province
|- valign="top"
| 
! scope="row" | 
| Gaza and Inhambane provinces
|-
| style="background:#b0e0e6;" | 
! scope="row" style="background:#b0e0e6;" | Indian Ocean
| style="background:#b0e0e6;" | Mozambique Channel
|- valign="top"
| 
! scope="row" | 
| Toliara and Fianarantsoa provinces
|-
| style="background:#b0e0e6;" | 
! scope="row" style="background:#b0e0e6;" | Indian Ocean
| style="background:#b0e0e6;" |
|- valign="top"
| 
! scope="row" | 
| Western Australia, Northern Territory and Queensland
|-
| style="background:#b0e0e6;" | 
! scope="row" style="background:#b0e0e6;" rowspan="2" | Pacific Ocean
| style="background:#b0e0e6;" | Coral SeaPassing just south of Cato Reef in 's Coral Sea Islands Territory
|-
| style="background:#b0e0e6;" | 
| style="background:#b0e0e6;" | Passing just north of the Minerva Reefs, and just south of Tubuai
|-
| 
! scope="row" | 
| Antofagasta Region
|- valign="top"
| 
! scope="row" | 
| Jujuy, Salta, Jujuy (again), Salta (again) and Formosa provinces
|- valign="top"
| 
! scope="row" | 
| Boquerón, Presidente Hayes, Concepción, San Pedro and Amambay departments
|- valign="top"
| 
! scope="row" | 
| Mato Grosso do Sul, Paraná, and São Paulo states
|- valign="top"
| style="background:#b0e0e6;" | 
! scope="row" style="background:#b0e0e6;" | Atlantic Ocean
| style="background:#b0e0e6;" |
|-
|}

Places located along the Tropic of Capricorn 
The following cities and landmarks are either located near the Tropic of Capricorn, or the tropic passes through them.

  Argentina
 Andes Mountains
 The Chaco
 San Salvador de Jujuy

 Australia
 Paraburdoo, Western Australia
 Newman, Western Australia
 Kumpupintil Lake, Western Australia
 Gibson Desert, Western Australia
 Ikuntji, Northern Territory
 Alice Springs, Northern Territory
 Amaroo, Queensland
 Longreach, Queensland
 Great Dividing Range, Queensland
 Emerald, Queensland
 Gracemere, Queensland
 Rockhampton, Queensland
 Cape Capricorn, Queensland

  Botswana
 Kalahari Desert
 Khutse Game Reserve
 Kule
 Mahalapye

  Brazil
 Amambai
 Araçariguama
 Itaquaquecetuba
 Mogi das Cruzes
 Maringá
 Sorocaba
 Santana de Parnaíba
 São Paulo-Guarulhos International Airport
 São Paulo (Tremembé)
 São Roque
 Guarulhos
 Taguaí
 Ubatuba

 Chile
 Atacama Desert
 Andes Mountains
 Antofagasta

  Madagascar
 Toliara

  Mozambique
 Inhambane 
 Morrumbene
 Massinga

  Namibia
 Walvis Bay
 Swakopmund
 Namib Desert

  Paraguay
 Concepción

  South Africa
 Kruger National Park
 Polokwane
 Capricorn District Municipality

List of countries entirely south of the Tropic of Capricorn 
As most of earth's land is in the Northern Hemisphere only four countries are wholly south of the Tropic of Capricorn (which contrasts with 73, about one third of the current total, wholly north of the Tropic of Cancer):
 Eswatini (formerly Swaziland)
 Lesotho
 New Zealand
 Uruguay

See also 

 Circle of latitude
 Arctic Circle
 Tropic of Cancer
 Equator
 23rd parallel south
 24th parallel south
 Antarctic Circle
 Axial tilt
 Milankovitch cycles
 Capricornus

Note

References

External links 

 Temporal Epoch Calculations
 Useful constants" See: Obliquity of the ecliptic
 Montana State University: Milankovitch Cycles & Glaciation

S23
Tropics

de:Wendekreis (Breitenkreis)#Südlicher Wendekreis
pl:Zwrotnik (geografia)